Tosh is a nickname of:

 Tosh Askew, English rugby coach
 Tosh Barrell (1888–1960), English footballer
 Tosh Chamberlain (1934–2021), English former footballer
 Tosh Farrell, former coach at Premier League club, Everton FC
 Tosh Masson (born 1985), rugby union player, former Harlequins player in the Guinness Premiership
 Tosh McKinlay (born 1964), Scottish footballer
 Tosh Powell (c. 1900–1928), Welsh boxer
 John Toshack (born 1949), former footballer and manager

Lists of people by nickname